ABP Pvt. Ltd. is an Indian media conglomerate headquartered in Kolkata, West Bengal. It was established in 1922.

History 

The company in recent years did mass layoffs at various times.

Current assets

Newspapers
 Anandabazar Patrika – Bengali-language daily newspaper
 The Telegraph – English-language daily newspaper.

Magazines
 Anandamela
 Sananda
 Anandalok
 Desh
 Boier Desh
 The Telegraph in Schools (TTIS)

TV Channels

News channels

Entertainment channel

References

External links
 

 
Book publishing companies of India
Newspaper companies of India
Companies based in Kolkata
Mass media companies established in 1922
Indian companies established in 1922
Television broadcasting companies of India
Mass media companies of India
Television networks in India
Broadcasting